This is a list of notable people who are from Quebec, Canada, or have spent a large part or formative part of their career in that province.

Anchors
Kim Brunhuber, former CBC anchor
Pierre Bruneau, TVA
Nathalie Chung, RDI / SRC
Bernard Derome, SRC / RDI
Simon Durivage, RDI / SRC
Céline Galipeau, SRC / RDI
Bill Haugland, CTV
Jean-Luc Mongrain, TQS, TVA
Pascale Nadeau, SRC
Mutsumi Takahashi, CTV
Sophie Thibault, TVA
Todd van der Heyden, CTV

Artists and entertainers
Denys Arcand, screenwriter and director
Paul Arcand, radio personality and cinematographer
Gilles Archambault, novelist and commentator
André Arthur, radio personality, independent federal MP
Eva Avila, singer
Rachid Badouri, comedian
Pierre Bouvier, rock singer
René Balcer, film and TV writer and producer
Raoul Barré, inventor, cartoonist and animator of the silent film era
Michel Barrette, stand-up comedian, actor
Jay Baruchel, actor, director, writer
Victor-Lévy Beaulieu, author
Daniel Bélanger, singer
Marie-Claire Blais, author
Paul Bley, jazz pianist and composer
Lothaire Bluteau, actor
La Bolduc, singer
Paul-Émile Borduas, abstract painter
Isabelle Boulay, singer
Gerry Boulet, singer-songwriter
Pierre Bouvier, lead singer of Simple Plan
Glenda Braganza, actress
Michel Brault, cinematographer, pioneer of the esthetic of handheld camera, director, producer
Geneviève Bujold, actress
Pascale Bussières, actress
Win Butler, singer-songwriter
Roch Carrier, author
Charles Carson, painter
Robert Charlebois, singer-songwriter
Régine Chassagne, singer-songwriter, and instrumentalist from Arcade Fire
Coeur de Pirate born Béatrice Martin, pianist, singer-songwriter
Leonard Cohen, poet, author and songwriter
Marie-Josée Croze, actress
Peter Cullen, voice actor
Chuck Comeau, drummer and singer
Elisha Cuthbert, actress (born in Alberta, raised in Quebec)
Sylvia Daoust, sculptor
Charles Daudelin, sculptor
Esther Delisle, historian and author
Yvon Deschamps, author and comedian
Céline Dion, singer
Xavier Dolan, actor, director, screenwriter, editor, costume designer, and voice actor
Georges Dor, chansonnier, songwriter, author, playwright
Hélène Dorion, poet
Fifi D'Orsay, actress
Jean Duceppe, comedian
Louis Dudek, poet and literary critic
Diane Dufresne, singer and painter
Roy Dupuis, actor
Marcelle Ferron, glazier
Jennifer Finnigan, actress
Serge Fiori, singer-songwriter
Glenn Ford,  actor
Garou, singer
Mitsou Gélinas, pop star, radio and TV host, actress
Jean-Claude Germain, playwright, author
Huntley Gordon, actor
Pierre Granche, sculptor
Bruce Greenwood, actor, producer
Sylvain Grenier, professional wrestler
Anne Hébert, poet and novelist
Prudence Heward, painter
Pierre Jalbert, actor, champion skier and film editor
Will James, artist and writer of the American West
René Jodoin, animator, director and producer
Oliver Jones, jazz pianist
Claude Jutra, director, actor
Florence La Badie, actress
Éric Lapointe, singer
Pierre Lapointe, singer
Stéphanie Lapointe, singer
Carole Laure, singer, actress
Lucie Laurier, actress
Daniel Lavoie, singer and songwriter and actor (born in Manitoba, active in Quebec)
Louise Lecavalier, dancer
Félix Leclerc, poet and songwriter
Jean Leloup, singer
Félix Lengyel, Twitch streamer and former professional player in the Overwatch League
Robert Lepage, playwright, actor and film director
Édouard Lock, choreographer
Norm Macdonald, actor, comedian
Marie-Mai Bouchard, singer
Marilou Bourdon, singer 
André Mathieu, pianist and composer
Norman McLaren, director, animator
Guido Molinari, abstract painter
Edythe Morahan de Lauzon, poet
Jean-Paul Mousseau, muralist
Ben Mulroney, television personality; son of Brian 
Émile Nelligan, poet
Maryse Ouellet, wrestler
P. Reign, hip hop artist (born in Quebec, raised in Ontario) 
Kevin Parent, singer-songwriter
Bruno Pelletier, singer
Pierre Perrault, documentarist, poet
Oscar Peterson, jazz pianist
Luc Plamondon, songwriter
Mordecai Richler, author
Jean-Paul Riopelle, painter
Michel Rivard, singer-songwriter
Michael Sarrazin, actor
Anne Savage, painter
Mack Sennett, director
William Shatner, actor
Douglas Shearer, sound director/designer
Norma Shearer, actress
René Simard, singer, TV show host
Devon Soltendieck, television personality
Eva Tanguay, singer, vaudeville star
Miyuki Tanobe, painter
Diane Tell, singer-songwriter
Marie-Élaine Thibert, singer
Michel Tremblay, playwright, author
Roland Michel Tremblay, author, poet, scriptwriter
Armand Vaillancourt, sculptor, performance artist, social activist
Pierre Vallières, author, political activist
Gino Vannelli, singer and composer
Gilles Vigneault, poet and songwriter
Annie Villeneuve, singer
Arthur Villeneuve, painter
Denis Villeneuve, director
Andrée Watters, singer
Hal Willis born Leonald Francis Gauthier, singer

Business
H. Montagu Allan, businessman
Hugh Allan, shipping company operator
Laurent Beaudoin, CEO of Bombardier
Conrad Black, media mogul
Charles Bronfman, investor, developer
Edgar Bronfman, Sr., investor, distiller
Samuel Bronfman, distiller
Donald J. Carty, airline executive
André Chagnon, entrepreneur and philanthropist
Thomas Cleeve, food producer
Jean Coutu, retail pharmacy chain
Alphonse Desjardins, father of credit unions in America
Marie-Josée Drouin, economist
Alexander Galt, businessman, statesman
Mitch Garber, gaming, hotel executive, philanthropist
Guy Laliberté, founder of Cirque du Soleil
Bernard Lemaire, businessman and engineer
Jean-Louis Lévesque, financier
William Christoper Macdonald, tobacco manufacturer, philanthropist
John Wilson McConnell, publisher, philanthropist
James McGill, fur trader, real estate investor
Hartland Molson, brewer, sportsman, statesman
John Molson, brewer, transportation pioneer
Pierre Péladeau, media mogul
John Redpath, developer, opened first sugar refinery in Canada
Denis Stairs, Chairman, Montreal Engineering Co.
Sam Steinberg, grocery store magnate
Donald Tarlton, record producer, promoter
Colin Webster, industrialist, philanthropist

Politicians 
John Abbott
Adrien Arcand
André Boisclair
Lucien Bouchard
Andrée Boucher
Henri Bourassa
Robert Bourassa
Pierre Bourgault
George-Étienne Cartier, a father of the Canadian Confederation
Thérèse Casgrain
Jean Charest
Jean Chrétien, 20th Prime Minister of Canada
Irwin Cotler
Jean Drapeau
Pierre Ducasse
Gilles Duceppe
Maurice Duplessis
Ludger Duvernay
Francis Fox
Steven Guilbeault
Lomer Gouin
Michaëlle Jean, Governor General of Canada
Daniel Johnson, Sr.
Régis Labeaume
Louis-Hippolyte Lafontaine
Bernard Landry
Hector-Louis Langevin, a father of the Canadian Confederation
Pierre Laporte
Wilfrid Laurier
Jean Lesage
René Lévesque
Yolette Lévy
John Lynch-Staunton
Sean Patrick Maloney, Canadian/American politician and U.S. Representative for the state of New York since 2013; naturalized U.S. citizen
Pauline Marois
Thomas D'Arcy McGee, a father of the Canadian Confederation
Honoré Mercier
Yves Michaud
Brian Mulroney, 18th Prime Minister of Canada and father of etalk host Ben Mulroney
John Neilson
Robert Nelson
Wolfred Nelson
Edmund Bailey O'Callaghan
Louis-Joseph Papineau
Jacques Parizeau
Claude Ryan
Louis Stephen St-Laurent
Étienne-Paschal Taché, a father of the Canadian Confederation
Louis-Alexandre Taschereau
Daniel Tracey
Pierre Elliott Trudeau, 15th Prime Minister of Canada; father of current PM Justin Trudeau
François Legault

Sciences 
Sidney Altman, Nobel Prize winner
Daniel Borsuk, plastic surgeon, first Canadian to perform face transplant
Pierre Dansereau, father of ecology
Paul David, cardiologist
George Mercer Dawson, scientist
Reginald Fessenden, inventor
Armand Frappier, researcher in microbiology and immunology
Marc Garneau, astronaut, first Quebecer and Canadian in space, Minister of Transportation, Minister of Foreign Affairs
David H. Levy, astronomer
William Edmond Logan, geologist
Rudolph A. Marcus, 1992 Nobel Prize in Chemistry
Henry Morgentaler, physician, abortion-rights activist, president of Humanist Association of Canada
Julie Payette, astronaut, first Quebec woman in space, Governor General of Canada
Wilder Penfield, neurosurgeon, medical scientist
Simon Plouffe, mathematician and discoverer of the BBP formula
Hubert Reeves, astrophysicist
Hans Selye, inventor of the concept of physiological stress
Henri Wittmann, linguist
David Saint-Jacques, astronaut

Sports
Jennifer Abel, diver
 Dave Abelson (born 1975), tennis player
Jasey-Jay Anderson, snowboarder
Sebastien Toutant, snowboarder
Joel Anthony, basketball player
Alex Anthopoulos, baseball manager
Myriam Bédard, biathlete, Olympic gold medalist
Josée Bélanger, soccer player, olympic bronze medalist
Tanith Belbin, figureskater
Jean Béliveau, ice hockey player
Chris Benoît, professional wrestler
Mike Bossy, ice hockey player
Eugenie Bouchard (born 1994), professional tennis player
Gaétan Boucher, speed skater
Ray Bourque, ice hockey player
Patrice Bergeron-Cleary, ice hockey player
Adam Braz (born 1981), soccer player and Technical Director of the Montreal Impact of Major League Soccer
Martin Brodeur, ice hockey goalie
Marc-Olivier Brouillette, professional football player
 Hy Buller (1926–1968), All Star NHL ice hockey player
Dayana Cadeau, Haitian-born Canadian American professional bodybuilder
Gabrielle Carle soccer player 
Patrick Carpentier, IRL race car driver
Samuel Dalembert, basketball player
 Jason Demers (born 1988), ice hockey player
Éric Desjardins, ice hockey player
Étienne Desmarteau, Olympic athlete
Alexandre Despatie, diver
Marcel Dionne, ice hockey player
Steve Dubinsky (born 1970), ice hockey player
 Terry Farnsworth (born 1942), Olympic judoka
Leylah Fernandez, tennis player
Marc-André Fleury, ice hockey player
Gottfried Fuchs (1889–1972), German-Canadian Olympic soccer player
Éric Gagné, baseball player
Marc Gagnon, short-track speed skater
Arturo Gatti, boxer
Bernie "Boom Boom" Geoffrion, ice hockey player
Doug Harvey, ice hockey player
Émilie Heymans, diver
Alex Hilton, boxer
Dave Hilton Jr., boxer
Matthew Hilton, boxer
Garry Kallos (born 1956), wrestler and sambo competitor
Guy Lafleur (1951-2022), ice hockey player
Sébastien Lareau, professional tennis player
René Lecavalier, broadcaster
Vincent Lecavalier, ice hockey player
Cathy LeFrançois, IFBB professional bodybuilder
Mario Lemieux, ice hockey player
Kris Letang, ice hockey player
Roberto Luongo, ice hockey player
Joe Malone, ice hockey player
Rick Martel, professional wrestler
Rick Martin, ice hockey player
Russell Martin, baseball player
 Marie-Eve Nault, soccer player, olympic bronze medalist 
Maryse Ouellet, professional wrestler, Former WWE Divas Champion
Kevin Owens, professional wrestler, Former WWE Universal Champion
 Cory Pecker (born 1981), ice hockey player
Gilbert Perreault, ice hockey player
Chantal Petitclerc, wheelchair racer
Rocco Placentino, soccer player
Jacques Plante, ice hockey goalie
Manon Rhéaume, ice hockey goalie
Henri Richard, ice hockey player
Maurice Richard, ice hockey player
René Robert, ice hockey player
Yvon Robert, professional wrestler
Jacques Rougeau, professional wrestler
Patrick Roy, ice hockey goalie
 Eliezer Sherbatov (born 1991), Canadian-Israeli ice hockey player
Martin St. Louis, ice hockey player
Lance Stroll (born 1998), Formula 1 Driver
Georges St-Pierre, former UFC Welterweight Champion of the world
 Ronnie Stern (born 1967), ice hockey player
Howard Stupp (born 1955), Olympic wrestler
 Ari Taub (born 1971), Olympic Greco-Roman wrestler
Donald Theetge, racecar driver
José Théodore, ice hockey goaltender
 Charles Thiffault (born 1939), NHL ice hockey coach
Maurice Vachon, professional wrestler
Gilles Villeneuve, F1 race car driver
Jacques Villeneuve, F1 race car driver; son of Gilles Villeneuve
Edson Warner, Olympian, marksman
 Brian Wilks (born 1966), NHL hockey player 
Rhian Wilkinson, soccer player, two times Olympic bronze medalist 
 Bernie Wolfe (born 1951), NHL hockey player
Gump Worsley, ice hockey player
Aleksandra Wozniak, tennis player
 Larry "Rock" Zeidel (1928–2014), ice hockey player

Other
Louise Arbour, Supreme Court Justice (The Hague and Canada)
André Bessette, thaumaturge and founder of the St-Joseph's Oratory
Henri Raymond Casgrain, priest, author, historian
Michel Chartrand, union leader and left-wing activist
George Comer, polar explorer
Ernest Cormier, architect
Aurélie Crépeau, nun, founded the Grey Nuns of Nicolet, established the Hôtel-Dieu De Nicolet 
Louis Cyr, strongman
Northrop Frye, academic and literary critic
Lionel Groulx, priest, historian
René Marc Jalbert, soldier and hero of 1984 shooting at the National Assembly of Quebec
Louis Joliet, explorer
Madeleine Juneau, museologist, teacher, nun
Jean-Baptiste Kelly, vicar-general
Antoine Labelle, priest and builder
Régine Laurent, trade unionist
 Zoé Laurier, wife of Prime Minister Wilfrid Laurier
Paul-Émile Léger, Roman Catholic cardinal
Lyse Lemieux, Chief Justice of the Superior Court of Quebec
René Lepage de Ste-Claire, lord-founder of Rimouski
Bernard Lonergan, SJ, Jesuit priest, philosopher, theologian
Simon Mailloux, first Canadian soldier with an amputation to deploy on a combat mission
Jos Montferrand, French-Canadian hero
Édouard Montpetit, lawyer, economist, scholar
Bruno Pauletto, physiologist, shot putter, businessman, coach, author
Mélanie Paquin, beauty pageant winner
Hélène Pelletier-Baillargeon, journalist and writer
Pacifique Plante, crime-fighting lawyer
Joseph-Octave Plessis, archbishop
Roméo Sabourin, SOE agent, executed by the Nazis
Charles de Salaberry, soldier

See also

English-speaking Quebecer
Scots-Quebecer
Lists of people from Quebec by region
List of Acadians
List of Quebec writers
List of Quebec musicians
List of Quebec film directors
List of Quebec actors
List of Quebec comedians
List of Irish Quebecers
National Order of Quebec
List of people by nationality
List of people from Quebec City
List of people from Montreal
List of people from Laval, Quebec
List of people from Ontario
List of people from Toronto
List of people from Winnipeg
List of people from Calgary
List of people from Edmonton
List of people from British Columbia
List of people from Vancouver

External links
100 québécois qui ont fait le XXe siècle

References